Imelda, officially the Municipality of Imelda (Chavacano: Municipalidad de Imelda), is a 4th class municipality in the province of Zamboanga Sibugay, Philippines. According to the 2020 census, it has a population of 26,020 people.

The municipality was established on 11 November 1977 by virtue of Presidential Decree No. 1239 signed by Philippine President Ferdinand Marcos. It was formed from several barangays taken from the neighboring municipalities of Malangas, Siay, and Alicia and named after First Lady Imelda Marcos.  It is the least populous municipality in the province and the third smallest in area.

Geography

Barangays
Imelda is politically subdivided into 18 barangays.
 Balugo
 Bolungisan
 Baluyan
 Cana-an
 Dumpoc
 Gandiangan
 Israel (Balian Israel)
Lower Baluran
 La Victoria
 Little Baguio
 Lumbog
 Lumpanac
 Mali Little Baguio
 Poblacion (Santa Fe)
 Pulawan (Mountain View)
 San Jose
 Santa Barbara
 Upper Baluran

Climate

Demographics

Economy

References

External links
 Imelda Profile at PhilAtlas.com
 [ Philippine Standard Geographic Code]
Philippine Census Information

Imelda Marcos
Municipalities of Zamboanga Sibugay
Establishments by Philippine presidential decree